Street-level characters comprise a large part of the cast on the fictional HBO drama series The Wire. Characters in this section range from homeless drug addicts up to drug king-pins in charge of entire criminal empires.

Barksdale organization

Omar's crew

Stanfield organization

West Side

Avon Barksdale

Avon Barksdale was the head of the Barksdale organization in season one. He comes from the projects, lives in the projects and plans to stay in the projects. For most of the first season he is the target of homicide detective Jimmy McNulty, who seems to be the only authoritative figure aware of his presence or his empire, which spans the most sought-after drug-dealing territory in Baltimore. Avon is uniformly feared by all other drug dealing criminal organizations in Baltimore due to his ferocity but due to his 'West Side' mentality is no threat to 'East Side' gangs. Together with his closest friend Russell "Stringer" Bell, Avon and their enforcers hold a monopoly on the drug trade in West Baltimore through intimidation and murder.

Russell "Stringer" Bell

Stringer was Avon Barksdale's second-in-command, closest friend, advisor and the main strategist behind coordinating their street dealing organization which he does as the main contact for all business, while he attends a business college in relation to his aspiration as a clean businessman. Together, they operate out of a strip club which is a front for money laundering owned and licensed under a clean member of their gang. 

Stringer is portrayed as more humble and quiet than Avon but is every bit as ruthless as his friend. He has aspirations to eventually leave the streets and drug life as a whole behind him despite his close and long relationship with Avon. In the third season Bell is killed by Omar and Brother Mouzone in his own commercial building that was in development at the time.

D'Angelo Barksdale

D'Angelo Barksdale was Avon's nephew and a lieutenant in his drug dealing organization. He was mainly responsible for leading the corner boys in their street dealings and coordinating their earnings and performance. He was the main connection between the upper levels of the crew and the street kids that were selling the product. He struggles with the morality behind his trade and came close to informing on the crew because of it, only relenting because of loyalty to family ties his mother reminded him of before signing. He took the sentence and went to prison where he was killed by a hitman sent by Stringer Bell in season 2.

Bodie

Bodie was a dealer who came of age working for Avon Barksdale. After the Barksdale organization dissolves, he is briefly independent (supplied by the New Day Co-Op) until Marlo forces him to join his crew. He is shot in the head by O-dog with Snoop and Chris providing a distraction after being seen having a conversation with McNulty, because Marlo suspects he may be a snitch.

Poot Carr

Poot is a loyal drug dealer for the Barksdale organization, who serves brief prison time for his crimes. By the end of the series he is working at a shoe store attempting to distance himself from the game after growing tired of it and reeling from the loss of many friends.

Marlo Stanfield

Stanfield is a rising gang leader who gets into a turf war with the Barksdale Organization, becoming the key West Baltimore drug kingpin following Stringer Bell's death and Avon Barksdale's arrest. Stanfield is played by Jamie Hector.

Chris Partlow

Partlow is Marlo Stanfield's second-in-command and best friend in his drug dealing operation. He is played by Gbenga Akinnagbe.

Monk Metcalf

Monk is a lieutenant in the Stanfield organization, and the third most recognized leader of Marlo’s Organization.

Felicia "Snoop" Pearson

Snoop is a chief enforcer in the Stanfield Organization, she is a mid-way gangster and she is always seen with Chris Partlow.

Fruit

Played by: Brandon Fobbs 
Appears in: 
Season three: "Time after Time"; "All Due Respect"; "Dead Soldiers"; "Hamsterdam"; "Homecoming"; "Reformation" and "Mission Accomplished".
Season four: "Boys of Summer".
Fruit is a prominent crew chief of one of Marlo Stanfield's drug dealing crews, and works closely with Jamal and Justin. Fruit is identifiable by his ever-present Kangol hat, and is the chief for one of West Baltimore's most prominent street corners. He is first seen negotiating with Dennis "Cutty" Wise over how to distribute a package of dope. He seems to be fair, but he later rips Cutty off, saying the package was taken by the police. Cutty protests, but Fruit pulls a gun on him and forces Cutty to withdraw. 

Later in the season, his crew's territory is encroached upon by Bodie Broadus and his crew, which sparks the turf war with the Barksdale organization. Fruit is pressured by Marlo to force the Barksdale Organization away, and Fruit responds by gathering his muscle and beating most of the crew into submission with baseball bats. Cutty, now working for the Barksdale organization, takes part in the subsequent retaliation strike against Fruit's corner. Slim Charles kills one of Fruit's dealers, but Fruit escapes death because Cutty is unable to bring himself to kill again.

In "Boys of Summer", the season four premiere, Lex, the father of Patrice's child, watches Fruit and Patrice entering a nightclub. On leaving, they walk through the parking lot. Lex kills Fruit with a single gun shot to the head. He shows no regret for his action. To Patrice's horror, he simply asks, Sup Patrice?. Fruit's death results in Marlo ordering an immediate retaliation hit on Lex.

East Side

"Proposition Joe" Stewart

Joseph "Proposition Joe" Stewart is an Eastside drug kingpin who supplies much of Baltimore through his direct connection to The Greek's smuggling organization. He is murdered and replaced as leader of New Day Co-op by Marlo Stanfield.

Melvin "Cheese" Wagstaff
Cheese is the nephew of Proposition Joe and a crew chief in his Eastside drug crew. He is murdered by Slim Charles in the final episode as retribution for his role in Joe’s death. Although never revealed in the series, Cheese is Randy Wagstaff's father. Originally, his first name was listed as "Calvin" on the official HBO site, but it was later changed to "Melvin". The character is played by rapper Method Man.

Frog

Played by: Gary "Damien Reign" Senkus Jr
Appears in season two: "Undertow"; "Backwash" and "Port in a Storm" (uncredited). season five: "-30-" (uncredited)
Frog is a white street-level dealer from Greektown, Baltimore who was raised on Rapolla Street just like Nick. He used to attend St. Casimir Church, Baltimore. His allegiances are never made clear, though from the photo on the crime board in Season 2 he is shown with Petey Dixon. He is seen early in season two distributing a package for Ziggy Sobotka (and stealing from him in the process) and later negotiates with Nick Sobotka, who first admonishes him for being a wigga, to distribute another. 

During the early stages of season two's investigation, he sells heroin to Thomas "Herc" Hauk and is photographed by Kima Greggs and Ellis Carver. He can also be seen for a split second in the series finale during the closing montage.

Nick Sobotka

Louis and Joan's son and Frank's nephew, Nick is a well-liked young stevedore with extensive family connections to the Baltimore port and links to the criminal underworld.

Ziggy Sobotka

Ziggy is Frank's son, an impulsive and often reckless young checker, loosely based on Pinkie Bannion, a real life docker in the Baltimore area, at the docks with a desire to prove himself and a respected father to live up to.

"White" Mike McArdle

Played by: Brook Yeaton 
Appears in season two: "Collateral Damage"; "Stray Rounds" (uncredited); "Bad Dreams" and "Port in a Storm" (Uncredited).
White Mike is a mid-level South Baltimore drug dealer from Curtis Bay with his own territory. He supplied Ziggy Sobotka with packages of narcotics to distribute but their relationship soured when Ziggy failed to make adequate profit from the package. He is one of several characters in The Wire who are fond of strawberry soda. McArdle was supplied by The Greek's smuggling operation and was arrested as part of an investigation into that operation. He was quick to turn against his suppliers and gave up all the information he had.

McNulty's last name was originally McArdle, according to a draft of the pilot script. Brook Yeaton is also credited as an assistant set dresser and set dressing buyer for the show.

Fat Face Rick
Played by: Troj Marquis Strickland
Appears in:
Season three: "Straight and True" (uncredited); "Slapstick"; "Reformation"
Season four: "Home Rooms" (uncredited); "Final Grades"
Season five: "More with Less"; "Transitions"; "The Dickensian Aspect"; and "–30–."

Ricardo "Fat Face Rick" Hendrix is a drug kingpin from Baltimore's Veronica Avenue, on the East Side. He is typically seen smoking a cigar, and is among the first to join the New Day Co-Op. He is a dissenting voice in the Co-Op for Stringer Bell when Avon Barksdale is warring with Marlo Stanfield. Rick and Phil Boy assist Proposition Joe when he gives Bell the ultimatum, to either end the war with Stanfield or lose access to the high-quality heroin.

Later, he is the first to bring up the idea that West Sider Marlo Stanfield should work with the Co-Op against the encroachment from New York dealers. In season four, episode 11 ("A New Day"), Omar and Renaldo are spying on the New-Day Co-Op and briefly discuss a time when they robbed Fat Face Rick, who "fell down on his knees, wept like a little baby." At the end of the fourth season, Rick leads the quorum confronting Joe, after Omar has stolen the shipment.

In the fifth season Rick's full name is revealed as Ricardo Hendrix, when The Baltimore Sun runs a story exposing a corrupt property deal. Rick owns a strip club named Desperado and the council wants to relocate him to redevelop the land. However, they are offering to pay Hendrix more than his club is worth and to sell him better council owned property elsewhere so that he will net a million dollars for moving. The paper exposes a history of campaign donations from Rick and people using the address of his club including several to city council president Nerese Campbell who is sponsoring the property deal.

Hendrix continues his involvement with the Co-Op and brags in a meeting about his property deal with his friend Hungry Man - drawing the ire of Stanfield.

After Stanfield's arrest and sale of the connection to the Greeks, Hendrix, along with Slim Charles, is seen, in the series finale, meeting with Spiros Vondas and The Greek, discussing the new business arrangement for importing the drugs into Baltimore.

Hungry Man
Played by: Duane Chandler Rawlings
Appears in:
Season four: "Home Rooms" (uncredited) and "Final Grades".
Season five: "More With Less" and "Transitions".
Nathaniel "Hungry Man" Manns is an older East Side drug kingpin and charter member of the New Day Co-Op. He is at the meeting to discuss encouraging Marlo Stanfield to join the Co-Op to combat the incursion of New York drug dealers into eastern Baltimore. Hungry Man believes that Stanfield is hiding bodies by putting several into individual coffins through a funeral home front until he is corrected by Slim Charles. He is part of the quorum that confronts "Proposition Joe" Stewart following Omar Little's robbery of the Co-Op.
 
In the fifth season, Baltimore County territory is divided among Eastside kingpins to compensate for territory lost in the gentrification of east Baltimore. Hungry Man is one of the people to benefit from the arrangement. He tells Marlo Stanfield that he is out of line for encouraging Prop Joe to delegate control of the territory to his subordinates. 

Later Hungry Man airs a grievance with Prop Joe's nephew Cheese because Cheese has been encroaching upon the territory assigned to Hungry Man. Cheese is furious, but Prop Joe promises that Cheese will respect the agreed upon boundaries. 

Stanfield observes Cheese storming out of the meeting. Stanfield has his enforcers Chris Partlow and Snoop kidnap Hungry Man and deliver him to Cheese as a gift to encourage Cheese to betray Prop Joe. When Hungry Man's body surfaces, the implication is that Cheese has killed him.

Ghost
Played by: Mike D. Anderson
Appears in:
Season three: "Straight and True" (uncredited); "Slapstick" (uncredited).
Season four: "Final Grades" (uncredited).
Season five: "More With Less" (uncredited)"Transitions" (uncredited) and "The Dickensian Aspect"(uncredited)
Ghost is an East side drug kingpin and Co-Op member. He is part of the quorum that confronts "Proposition Joe" Stewart following Omar Little's robbery of the Co-Op. In the fifth season Ghost receives Baltimore County territory to compensate for territory lost in the gentrification of East Baltimore. Ghost continues to attend Co-Op meetings throughout the fifth season.

George "Double G" Glekas
Played by: Teddy Cañez
Appears in season two: "Ebb Tide"; "Hot Shots";"Hard Cases"; "Duck and Cover"; "Stray Rounds" and "Storm Warnings".

George Alexander Glekas (Greek: Γιώργος Αλέξανδρος Γλεκας; February 18, 1960 - 2003) runs a warehouse and appliance store for The Greek under the name Pyramid Industries. He acts as the organization's fence. Glekas often gets advice from Spiros "Vondas" Vondopoulos on important deals. The retail store he owns was used as a front to move their stolen goods from the docks.

Prior to appearing in the series Glekas had been charged with fencing stolen goods in San Diego, but the case was dropped for lack of evidence. Glekas was indicted in the smuggling investigation but was not arrested because he was shot and killed by Ziggy Sobotka in a dispute over payment for a stolen car smuggling deal. Ziggy confesses to the murder and was shown serving time for the crime.

Phil Boy
Played by: Sho 'Swordsman' Brown
Appears in:
Season three: "Slapstick" (uncredited); "Reformation"
Season four: "Final Grades"
Season five: "Transitions"; "The Dickensian Aspect"; and "–30–."
Phil Boy is another portly kingpin who joins the Co-Op, though he does not attend the initial formation meeting. He is noticeably younger than his colleagues, and he can be recognized by the do-rag he always wears. He and Fat Face Rick accompany "Proposition Joe" Stewart when he gives Stringer Bell the ultimatum, to either end the war with Marlo Stanfield or lose access to the high-quality heroin. 

Philboy is part of the quorum that confronts Stewart after Omar Little steals their shipment of narcotics. Phil Boy continues to attend Co-Op meetings in the fifth season. He is also present at the first meeting of the re-formed Co-op following Marlo's downfall in the series finale.

Others

Bubbles

Bubbles is a heroin addict with a vast knowledge of the streets of Baltimore. He becomes an informant after a friend whom he introduced to the drug lifestyle gets badly beaten when using counterfeit money upon Bubbles' advice. Bubbles volunteers information and creatively points out key figures to the police in exchange for small amounts of cash for him and for his friend's escaping prosecution for a drug-related crime. Bubbles also befriends Kima, and despite their different situations, they share a level of mutual respect and empathy.

Brother Mouzone

Brother Mouzone, meaning "judicious" in Arabic, is a drug enforcer and hitman from New York City. "The Brother" does not fit the usual picture of drug-trade "muscle", always wearing a suit, bowtie, and glasses, speaking politely and precisely. He is also quite erudite, reading magazines such as The Economist, Harper's, The Atlantic, The New Republic, and The Nation. His attire, extremely proper and pious persona, and title of "Brother" imply that he is associated with the Nation of Islam, specifically its paramilitary wing, the Fruit of Islam, although this is never explicitly stated. 

On first encountering Mouzone, the street dealer Cheese mocks his formal style of dress by remarking that he must either be in "the Nation" or still let his mother pick out his clothes. He reveals himself as a Muslim when, believing he is about to die, he mouths "Allahu akbar" repeatedly after Omar shoots him. He is always accompanied by his "man" Lamar, who runs errands for Mouzone.

The Deacon  

Played by: Melvin Williams
Appears in 
Season three: "All Due Respect", "Straight and True", "Back Burners", "Moral Midgetry", "Slapstick", "Reformation",
Season four: "Home Rooms", "Refugees", "Margin of Error", "That's Got His Own".
Season five: "Late Editions"

The Deacon is a West Side church figure who is involved in many community projects. He also has many contacts within the city’s academic population. He is a friend of teacher Grace Sampson and helps her ex-boyfriend Dennis "Cutty" Wise when he is released after a long prison sentence. Initially he tries to encourage Cutty to enroll in a GED program, but Cutty is not interested in this idea. 

The deacon then helps Cutty to open a community boxing gym. He puts Cutty in touch with State Delegate Odell Watkins through the politically influential Reverend Frank Reid to help with obtaining the necessary permits for the gym. He also helps Cutty to get a paying job working as a school custodian at Edward Tilghman Middle, where Grace teaches the eighth grade.

The Deacon is also friends with Howard "Bunny" Colvin. When Colvin was Western District police commander the Deacon often served as his conscience. Colvin started three drug tolerant zones in his district and the deacon was dismayed at the poor conditions addicts faced in these areas. He convinced Colvin to involve public health academics in providing services for the addicts now he had gathered them into an easy to reach area. Colvin was forced to retire because of his actions. The deacon found him a new job working with a sociologist, studying the prevention of repeat violent offender behavior.

As a middle-aged man, Melvin Williams, the actor who plays the Deacon, was a real-life drug kingpin who was arrested by series writer Ed Burns in 1984 when the latter was a Baltimore city police officer. Creator David Simon was responsible for covering the arrest for The Baltimore Sun at the time. Williams received a 34-year sentence for his crimes and much of the evidence against him came from a wiretap investigation like the one featured in the first season of the show.

Dee-Dee

Played by: Genevieve Hudson-Price
Appears in 
Season three: "Moral Midgetry"
Season four: "Corner Boys"
Season five: "Unconfirmed Reports"
Dee-Dee is a drug addict. In Season Three she shows up in the Hamsterdam area buying an eight-ball of cocaine from a car. A year later she is living in West Baltimore and working as a prostitute. Fifteen months later again she is seen at a narcotics anonymous meeting.

She is played by Genevieve Hudson-Price, the daughter of author Richard Price, who writes for the show.

Hucklebuck

Played by: Gil Deeble 
Appears in: 
Season one: "The Wire"
Season two: "Stray Rounds" (uncredited)
Season three: "Middle Ground" (uncredited)
Season five: "More with Less"
Hucklebuck is a drug addict and friend to Bubbles and Johnny. He often assists them on their "capers" to make money for drugs. He is a part of Johnny's copper house robbery scam in season 1. Hucklebuck continues to live on the street when Bubbles is in recovery in season 5.

Lamar

Played by: DeAndre McCullough 
Appears in: 
Season two: "Storm Warnings" (uncredited); "Bad Dreams" (uncredited) and "Port in a Storm" (uncredited).
Season three: "Reformation" and "Mission Accomplished".
Lamar is the assistant and inept bodyguard of New York mercenary Brother Mouzone. He has accompanied Mouzone on both his visits to Baltimore. On their first trip they worked at the Franklin Terrace high rises for Avon Barksdale – guarding his territory against East Side drug dealers. Lamar failed to protect his charge against Omar Little on this trip. He was distracted by a dog and knocked unconscious by Omar while guarding a motel room door. His failure allowed Omar to enter the room and shoot Brother Mouzone.

Brother Mouzone recovered and returned to Baltimore for revenge. He had Lamar seek out Omar in various gay bars, having learned that he was homosexual. Lamar resented the task and his visceral homophobia made him confrontational with those he came across while searching for Omar. Eventually Lamar was approached by Omar’s boyfriend Dante allowing Mouzone to capture him and find Omar.

DeAndre McCullough, the actor who plays Lamar, was profiled in David Simon and Edward Burns's book and television miniseries The Corner.  McCullough was found dead on August 1, 2012, in the Woodlawn section of Baltimore County.

Raylene Lee

Played by: Shamika Cotton
Appears in: 
Season four: "Refugees", "Corner Boys", "Misgivings", "A New Day" (uncredited) and "That's Got His Own"
Season five: "Transitions" and "The Dickensian Aspect"
Raylene Lee is Michael Lee and "Bug"'s mother. She is a drug addict.

Devar Manigault

Played by: Cyrus Farmer
Appears in: 
Season four: "Corner Boys", "Know Your Place" and "Misgivings"
Devar Manigault is Raylene Lee's partner and father to her younger son "Bug". Devar is feared by Michael and it is heavily implied that Michael suffered sexual abuse by Devar. Shortly after Devar is released from prison he is savagely beaten to death by Chris Partlow at Michael's behest. Chris spits on him at the crime scene, leaving his DNA, leading to his arrest for murder.

Squeak

Played by: Mia Arnice Chambers
Appears in season three: "Back Burners"; "Moral Midgetry"; "Slapstick"; "Reformation" and "Mission Accomplished".
Squeak is the girlfriend of Bernard, a low level member of the Barksdale organization. Bernard was responsible for supplying the organization with disposable mobile phones and was told to buy no more than two phones at any one outlet and provide receipts for his purchases. Squeak's nagging convinced Bernard to start breaking these rules.

Squeak was an old acquaintance of Bubbles and their association allowed the police to use her as an inroad to the Barksdale organization. Bubbles put Squeak and Bernard in touch with Lester Freamon who was a posing as a conman who could provide them with phones at lower price. With Squeak's encouragement, Bernard accepted Freamon's offer and began buying solely from him on the condition that he provide him with receipts. 

Freamon gave Bernard pre-wiretapped phones that eventually brought down the Barksdale organization. When the investigation was closed with the arrest of Avon Barksdale, Bernard and Squeak were also brought in. Bernard joked that he could not wait to go to jail to get away from Squeak.

Sherrod
Played by: Rashad Orange
Appears in 
Season three: "All Due Respect" (uncredited); "Mission Accomplished" (uncredited)
Season four: "Soft Eyes"; "Refugees"; "Alliances"; "Unto Others"; "A New Day"; "That's Got His Own".
Sherrod is a young homeless boy who is befriended by Bubbles. He has been living on the streets since his mother succumbed to drug addiction. He last regularly attended school in the fifth grade at Steuart Hill elementary, though Bubbles tried to get him to go back at some point between the third and fourth seasons. As the fourth season starts, Bubbles is selling small items from a shopping cart to get by, and is trying to train Sherrod to run his own business.

Sherrod's basic math skills prove to be extremely poor, and Bubbles insists that he return to school. Bubbles visits Edward Tilghman middle school with Sherrod and convinces the Assistant Principal, Marcia Donnelly, to take him in, even though he has been missing from the school system for years. Sherrod only attends class once, when Bubbles forces him to, cutting class instead to go on the corner and deal drugs for "Jojo". 

He tries to fake doing homework by bringing books from school back to the squat he shares with Bubbles. It is thus revealed that Sherrod is illiterate as well as innumerate, as he does not know that the two books he is trying to pass off to Bubbles as a textbook and its associated workbook are actually an algebra textbook and a dictionary. Sherrod is completely unaware of his blunder, as he cannot read the titles on the covers. 

Bubbles, who can read, immediately notices Sherrod's lie and shows disappointment. When Bubbles finds Sherrod dealing on a school day, he tries to talk to him and is attacked by an addict who needs money. Bubbles then tells Sherrod that he cannot stay with him any more unless he returns to school.

Sherrod continues to deal drugs and is involved in an assault on Namond Brice when they vie for territory. He also becomes a drug addict. Eventually, he returns to Bubbles, saying he wants to get away but he owes Jojo money. Bubbles offers Sherrod the chance to return home and says he will help with the debt. Bubbles, however, had previously prepared a lethal "hot shot" of narcotics he intended to use to kill another addict who had repeatedly harassed and assaulted Bubbles. Sherrod finds the vial Bubbles has prepared and takes it himself, dying soon afterwards.

Walon
Played by: Steve Earle 
Appears in: 
Season one: "One Arrest", "Game Day" and "The Cost".
Season four: "Final Grades".
Season five: "Unconfirmed Reports", "React Quotes", "Late Editions", and "–30–".

Walon is an HIV-positive recovering drug addict. He first appears in season one when Bubbles and Johnny see him speaking at a Narcotics Anonymous meeting. Bubbles is moved by the strength Walon conveys in his speech. They see Walon again in the projects looking after his drug addicted nephew. 

Bubbles' conversations with Walon help him realise that he wants to get clean. When he makes a serious attempt, Walon gives him advice on keeping clean, which Bubbles is unable to stick with. Years later, when Bubbles is locked in a medical rehab facility, Walon visits him to again help him with his sobriety and grief. In season five he acts as Bubbles' sponsor, pushing him to be more open about his struggles and the death of Sherrod.

Walon is played by singer/songwriter and recovering heroin addict Steve Earle. Earle also performs the theme song for Season 5, and his track "I Feel Alright" is featured in the montage at the end of Season 2.

Johnny Weeks

Played by: Leo Fitzpatrick 
Appears in: 
Season one: "The Target"; "The Pager"; "The Wire"; "One Arrest"; "Game Day" and "Sentencing".
Season two: "Hard Cases" and "Port in a Storm".
Season three: "Time After Time"; "Dead Soldiers"; "Straight and True"; "Back Burners"; "Middle Ground" and "Mission Accomplished".
In season one Johnny is Bubbles' best friend and a drug addict with notoriously bad luck. He is naive and enthusiastic for "the game", allowing Bubbles to play the role of teacher. In the pilot episode he is badly beaten by Bodie Broadus, Poot Carr and Wallace after trying to pass counterfeit money to D'Angelo Barksdale's operation. This spurs Bubbles to become a police informant. Johnny disapproves and takes no part in it except when arrested by police.

While in the hospital for that beating, Johnny discovers he is HIV positive. He also undergoes a colostomy operation. Unlike Bubbles he shows no interest in giving up his addiction and continues thievery and various other scams with Bubbles, despite carrying a colostomy bag. In the season three finale he dies from an overdose. His body is discovered in a vacant house in the "Hamsterdam" free zone that Major Colvin had set up.

Johnny is based on a young white homeless addict that David Simon met while researching The Corner. This man would follow Simon's subject, drug addict Gary McCullough, around.

Dennis "Cutty" Wise

After getting out of prison he joins back up with the Barksdale crew as muscle, but cannot complete a task he was assigned. Instead, he leaves the criminal world and starts up a boxing center in an attempt to reach out to local street youths. He is later wounded trying to talk Michael Lee out of a life of crime. He reappears in Season 5 to briefly train Dukie as well as to give him advice on how to deal with people that give him trouble.

References

Lists of The Wire characters